Ulotrichopus mesoleuca is a moth of the  family Erebidae. It is found in South Africa, where it has been recorded from KwaZulu-Natal and Western Cape.

References

Endemic moths of South Africa
Moths described in 1858
Ulotrichopus
Moths of Africa